Dutch Pakistani or Pakistani Dutch may refer to:
Netherlands–Pakistan relations (c.f. "a Dutch–Pakistani treaty")
Pakistanis in the Netherlands (by analogy to "Pakistani American", though this is not a widely accepted usage)
Dutch people in Pakistan (by analogy to "British Pakistani", though this is not a widely accepted usage)
Multiracial people of Dutch and Pakistani descent